Héctor Lucchetti (born 9 March 1905, date of death unknown) was an Argentine fencer. He won a bronze medal in the team foil competition at the 1928 Summer Olympics.

References

1905 births
Year of death missing
20th-century Argentine people
Argentine male fencers
Argentine people of Italian descent
Fencers at the 1928 Summer Olympics
Fencers at the 1936 Summer Olympics
Medalists at the 1928 Summer Olympics
Olympic bronze medalists for Argentina
Olympic fencers of Argentina
Olympic medalists in fencing
Sportspeople from La Plata